Erinda Ballanca (born 29 October 1973, in Tirana) is an Albanian lawyer who is currently serving as the 3rd Ombudswoman of Albania, a post she has held since 2017.

Career 
An experienced lawyer who has been elected in leading positions such as the Steering Council of the Tirana Bar Association and the National Assembly of the Bar Association of Albania, Mrs. Ballanca has contributed to the drafting of Albanian legislation, starting with the Constitution and many other normative acts. She has also given lectures on Constitutional Law.

References

Ombudspersons in Albania
Living people
1973 births